Sunstone is a mineral used as a gemstone.

Sunstone or sun stone, may also refer to:

Places and fictional locations
 Sunstone Village, Ninemile Canyon, Utah, United States
 Sunstone, a neighborhood in Viera West, Florida, United States 
 Sunstone House, a theatre occupied by the Tower Theatre Company in Stoke Newington, London, England, UK
 Sunstone Manor, a fictional location in Heroes Reborn

Stones
 Sunstone (medieval), a crystal mentioned in medieval manuscripts in Iceland and supposed to reveal the position of the sun in overcast sky
 Iceland spar, a transparent crystallized mineral
 Aztec sun stone, a 16th-century sculpture excavated in Mexico City
 Sun Stone Obelisk, Gympie Pyramid, Gympie, Queensland, Australia

Fictional stones
 An artificially-grown stone in the fantasy book series The Seventh Tower
 Sun Stone, a magical item used by titular character in the animated series Princess Gwenevere and the Jewel Riders
 Titular magical objects in the video game Hugo: The Quest for the Sunstones
 A fictional gemstone in the Little Fuzzy, novel series
A fictional mineral in the Dinotopia book series (and its television adaptation)

Literature
 Sunstone (magazine), a periodical that discusses Mormonism through scholarship, art, short fiction, and poetry
 Sunstone (comics), an LGBT and BDSM related webcomic
 "Piedra de Sol", a 1957 poem by Octavio Paz with translated title of "Sunstone"

Music
 Sun Stone (album), a 2019 album by Roberto Magris
 "Sun Stone" (song), a song by Roberto Magris off the eponymous 2019 album Sun Stone (album)
 "Sunstone" (song), by Russell Ferrante, performed by Eric Marienthal, off the 1998 album Walk Tall (album)

Other uses
 Sunstone, a fictional character from Steven Universe
 An architectural motif in temples of The Church of Jesus Christ of Latter-day Saints, see Temple architecture (LDS Church)

See also